John Timothy Karna (born November 18, 1992) is an American actor. He is known for his role as Noah Foster in the first two seasons of the MTV slasher television series Scream, based on the film series of the same name. He is also known for appearing in the films Bindlestiffs (2012) and Premature (2014).

Filmography

Film

Television

Web

References

External links
 

21st-century American male actors
American male film actors
American male television actors
Living people
Male actors from Houston
1992 births